Sclerolobium pilgerianum is a species of legume in the family Fabaceae.
It is found only in Brazil.

References
 

Caesalpinioideae
Flora of Brazil
Endangered plants
Taxonomy articles created by Polbot
Taxobox binomials not recognized by IUCN